Abdominal compartment syndrome (ACS) occurs when the abdomen becomes subject to increased pressure reaching past the point of intra-abdominal hypertension (IAH).  ACS is present when intra-abdominal pressure rises and is sustained at > 20 mmHg and there is new organ dysfunction or failure. ACS is classified into three groups: Primary, secondary and recurrent ACS.  It is not a disease and as such it occurs in conjunction with many disease processes, either due to the primary illness or in association with treatment interventions. Specific cause of abdominal compartment syndrome is not known, although some causes can be sepsis and severe abdominal trauma. Increasing pressure reduces blood flow to abdominal organs and impairs pulmonary, cardiovascular, renal, and gastro-intestinal (GI) function, causing obstructive shock, multiple organ dysfunction syndrome and death.

Causes
 Peritoneal tissue edema secondary to diffuse peritonitis, abdominal trauma
 Fluid therapy due to massive volume resuscitation
 Retroperitoneal hematoma secondary to trauma and aortic rupture
 Peritoneal trauma secondary to emergency abdominal operations
 Reperfusion injury following bowel ischemia due to any cause
 Retroperitoneal and mesenteric inflammatory edema secondary to acute pancreatitis
 Ileus and bowel obstruction
 Intra-abdominal masses of any cause
 Abdominal packing for control of bleeding
 Closure of the abdomen under undue tension
 Ascites (intra-abdominal fluid accumulation)
 Acute pancreatitis with abscesses formation

Pathophysiology
Abdominal compartment syndrome occurs when tissue fluid within the peritoneal and retroperitoneal space (either edema, retroperitoneal blood or free fluid in the abdomen) accumulates in such large volumes that the abdominal wall compliance threshold is crossed and the abdomen can no longer stretch. Once the abdominal wall can no longer expand, any further fluid leaking into the tissue results in fairly rapid rises in the pressure within the closed space. Initially this increase in pressure does not cause organ failure but does prevent organs from working properly – this is called intra-abdominal hypertension and is defined as a pressure over 12 mmHg in adults.  ACS is defined by a sustained IAP(intra-abdominal pressure) above 20 mmHg with new-onset or progressive organ failure. Severe organ dysfunctionent syndrome. These pressure measurements are relative. Small children get into trouble and develop compartment syndromes at much lower pressures while young previously healthy athletic individuals may tolerate an abdominal pressure of 20 mmHg very well. 
The underlying cause of the disease process is capillary permeability caused by the systemic inflammatory response syndrome (SIRS) that occurs in every critically ill patient. SIRS leads to leakage of fluid out of the capillary beds into the interstitial space in the entire body with a profound amount of this fluid leaking into the gut wall, mesentery and retroperitoneal tissue.

Abdominal compartment syndrome follows a destructive pathway similar to compartment syndrome of the extremities. When increased compression occurs in such a hollow space, organs will begin to collapse under the pressure. As the pressure increases and reaches a point where the abdomen can no longer be distended it starts to affect the cardiovascular and pulmonary systems. When abdominal compartment syndrome reaches this point without surgery and help of a silo the patient will most likely die. There is a high mortality rate associated with abdominal compartment syndrome.

Diagnosis
Abdominal compartment syndrome is defined as an intra-abdominal pressure above 20 mmHg with evidence of organ failure. Abdominal compartment syndrome develops when the intra-abdominal pressure rapidly reaches certain pathological values, within several hours (intra-abdominal hypertension is observed), and lasts for 6 or more hours. The key to recognizing abdominal compartment syndrome is the demonstration of elevated intra-abdominal pressure which is performed most often via the urinary bladder, and it is considered to be the "gold standard". Multiorgan failure includes damage to the cardiac, pulmonary, renal, neurological, gastrointestinal, abdominal wall, and ophthalmic systems. The gut is the most sensitive to intra-abdominal hypertension, and it develops evidence of end-organ damage before alterations are observed in other systems. In a recent systematic review, Holodinsky et al. described 25 risk factors associated with IAH (intra-abdominal hypertension) and 16 with ACS (abdominal compartment syndrome). These can be roughly categorized in three categories, which may be more helpful at the bedside to identify patients at risk (Table 1). Especially noteworthy is the potential role of fluid resuscitation in the development of IAH and ACS. Recognizing the pivotal role of fluid resuscitation in the pathogenesis of IAH and ACS supplies the clinician with a target for preventive measures. Large volume resuscitation with crystalloids should be avoided in patients with or at risk of ACS.

Treatment

Operative decompression
The mortality rate associated with abdominal compartment syndrome is significant, ranging between 60% and 70%. The poor outcome relates not only to abdominal compartment syndrome itself but also to concomitant injury and hemorrhagic shock. The surgical decompression of the abdomen remains the treatment of choice of abdominal compartment syndrome; this usually improves the organ changes and is followed by one of the temporary abdominal closure techniques in order to prevent secondary intra-abdominal hypertension. Surgical decompression can be achieved by opening the abdominal wall and abdominal fascia anterior in order to physically create more space for the abdominal viscera. Once opened, the fascia can be bridged for support and to prevent loss of domain by a variety of medical devices (Bogota bag, artificial bur, and vacuum devices using negative pressure wound therapy).

References

External links 

 openabdomen.org
 wsacs.org

Syndromes